The Rockford Institute was an American conservative think-tank associated with paleoconservatism, based in Rockford, Illinois. It ran the John Randolph Club and published the magazine Chronicles. In early 2019, the Rockford Institute merged with the Charlemagne Institute (renamed from Intellectual Takeout in 2018), which became the new publisher of Chronicles. , Devin C. Foley is listed as the institute's chief executive officer. The Charlemagne Institute describes itself as "leading a cultural movement to defend and advance Western Civilization, the foundation of our American republic."

Chronicles peaked in the 1990s and helped shape the paleoconservative revival that accompanied Patrick Buchanan's 1992 and 1996 presidential campaigns. At its peak, it had 15,000 subscribers. As of September, 2016, there were 6,700 subscribers.

History
The institute was founded in 1976 by Rockford College president John A. Howard as a response to American social changes of the 1960s. Allan Carlson served as president until 1997. He and Howard left to found The Howard Center for Family, Religion and Society which opposes abortion, divorce, and homosexuality, promoting instead the "child-rich, married parent" family., an offshoot of the Rockford Institute. It was located in Rockford, Illinois. 

Thomas Fleming, editor of Chronicles, succeeded Carlson as president of the Rockford Institute. The institute also retained the Ingersoll Prize.

In 1988 the institute and Richard John Neuhaus, a Lutheran pastor, invited Cardinal Ratzinger to give a lecture in New York in January. On May 5, 1989, Neuhaus and his Religion and Society Center were evicted from the institute's New York office after he complained about what he said were "the racist and anti-Semitic tones" of Chronicles. The charge, which was supported by other leading conservatives, was denied by the institute. They said the office, called Rockford East, was closed for budgetary reasons and because of concerns that Neuhaus was not following institute policies. According to political commentator David Frum, the split was seen by leading conservatives as a sign of the division between the paleoconservative and the neo-conservative elements of the movement.

Chronicles magazine 

Chronicles is a U.S. monthly magazine published by the Rockford Institute. Its full current name is Chronicles: A Magazine of American Culture. The magazine is known for promoting anti-globalism, anti-intervention, and anti-immigration stances within conservative politics, and is considered one of the leading paleoconservative publications. (It has also published libertarians and even leftists, such as Erwin Knoll and Gore Vidal.)

In 2000, James Warren at The Chicago Tribune commented that "There are few publications more cerebral than Chronicles".

, the executive editor was Aaron D. Wolf and, Srđa Trifković was editor for foreign affairs. Contributors over the years have included the conservative activist Peter Gemma, now living in Sarasota, Florida. , its website names Paul Gottfried as its Interim Editor-in-Chief and Edmund Welsch as Executive Editor, and was hosted by (and listed as a programme of) the Charlemagne Institute.

Chronicles also promoted the activities of the John Randolph Club (1989-1995), a project of the Rockford Institute to promote dialogue and alliances between paleoconservatives and paleolibertarians.

Editors 
 Leopold Tyrmand 1977-1985
 Thomas Fleming, 1985

See also

 Howard Center for Family, Religion and Society

References

External links 
Previous versions of the Rockford Institute website
  — combination of Rockford Institute, Chronicles, and the Center for International Affairs up to 2002
  — official website up to 2012
Chronicles Magazine web site
"A brief history of Chronicles" by E. Christian Kopff, First Principles Journal (Wayback machine link)

1976 establishments in Illinois
Culture of Rockford, Illinois
Political and economic think tanks in the United States
Non-profit organizations based in Illinois
Paleoconservative organizations
Conservative organizations in the United States